Algeciras Club de Fútbol is a Spanish football team based in Algeciras, in the autonomous community of Andalusia. Founded in 1909 it plays in Primera División RFEF – Group 1, holding home matches at Estadio Nuevo Mirador.

History 
Football became of interest in Algeciras at the end of the 19th century from the British colony of Gibraltar. In their early years the teams of the city played in several sand fields around the city; one of these provisional camps was located near the fairgrounds of the city El Calvario. This field was the first in where Algeciras CF played its matches. The club was officially founded in 1909.

When the club was founded, it did not have an official t-shirt, so they played with the players own clothes. But when they started to play very often, they decided that it was the moment to use new and exclusive equipment. In that moment, it was very difficult to get sport equipment, so some people who worked for the club, went to Gibraltar looking for t-shirts. They chose a red and white t-shirt that belonged to an English team called Southampton Football Club. In that moment, the team played in different sand pitches near the city. El Polvorín or El Calvario were some of them,

In 1956, the club merged with UD España to form España de Algeciras CF before switching back to Algeciras CF in the following year. After this, the club played between Third division and Second B many years, including some declines to regional categories, with three promotions to the Second Division in 1978, 1983 and 2003.

Season to season

9 seasons in Segunda División
2 seasons in Primera División RFEF
18 seasons in Segunda División B
44 seasons in Tercera División

Current squad
.

Reserve team

Former players
see

Former coaches
 Vicente Campillo
 Josu Ortuondo
 Manuel Ruiz
 Jordi Vinyals

Stadium
Estadio Nuevo Mirador seats 7,500 spectators. Its opening took place in 1999, with a friendly with Real Betis. Previously, the team played in "El Mirador" that was in the city center, and its opening took place in 1954.

Home kit
Algeciras' main uniform consists of red-and-white stripes shirt, blue shorts and red socks. The kit was adopted from Southampton in England, being chosen from different English kits that were brought to a shop in Gibraltar, as this type of gear was not available in the area at the time.

References

External links
Official website 
Futbolme team profile 
Algeciristas, website containing weekly updates, historic database 

 
Football clubs in Andalusia
Association football clubs established in 1941
Sport in Algeciras
1941 establishments in Spain
Segunda División clubs
Primera Federación clubs
Football clubs in Spain